This is an overview of the progression of the Olympic track cycling record of the men's 4000 m team pursuit, as recognised by the Union Cycliste Internationale (UCI).

The men's team pursuit was introduced at the 1908 Summer Olympics and with the 4000 m distance at the 1920 Summer Olympics. Strangely the UCI list the first Olympic record as of 1992 although the event has already been contested at several Olympic Games before.

Progression
♦ denotes a performance that is also a current world record.  Statistics are correct as of the end of the 2020 Summer Olympics.

* Not listed by the UCI as an Olympic record

References

Track cycling Olympic record progressions